Simon Roberts (born 13 November 1985) is an Australian cricketer. He played in one Twenty20 match for South Australia in 2007.

See also
 List of South Australian representative cricketers

References

External links
 

1985 births
Living people
Australian cricketers
South Australia cricketers
Cricketers from Adelaide